Real Enemies is an album by Darcy James Argue's Secret Society. It earned Argue and the Secret Society a Grammy Award nomination for Best Large Jazz Ensemble Album.

Track listing

Personnel

 Darcy James Argue – producer, liner notes
 Jonathan Powell – flugelhorn
 Matt Holman – flugelhorn
 Nadje Noordhuis – flugelhorn
 Ingrid Jensen – trumpet
 Jacob Garchik – trombone
 Mike Fahie – trombone
 Ryan Keberle – trombone
 Rob Wilkerson – alto saxophone
 Dave Pietro – alto saxophone, piccolo
 John Ellis – tenor saxophone
 Sam Sadigursky – tenor saxophone, clarinet
 Carl Maraghi – baritone saxophone
 Adam Birnbaum – piano, electric piano
 Matt Clohesy – bass
 Sebastian Noelle – guitar
 Alan Ferber – producer
 James Urbaniak – engineer, narrator
 Brian Montgomery – engineer, mixing, producer
 Dustin Marshall – engineer
 Alex Hendrickson – assistant engineer
 Jack Mason – assistant engineer
 Randy Merrill – mastering

References

2016 albums
Darcy James Argue albums